Gretchen Dobervich (born February 4, 1973) is an American politician.   Dobervich is a Democratic-NPL member of the North Dakota House of Representatives who has represented District 11 since October 2016.  District 11 is in south central Fargo and includes Fargo South High, Carl Ben Eielson Middle School, Lewis and Clark Elementary, and Lindenwood Park

Biography 
Dobervich was born in Bismarck, ND and was raised on a farm and ranch in Slope County, ND. She graduated from Divide County High School in 1991. Dobervich received a Bachelor of Social Work from Minot State University.  She is married to Eric Michael Dobervich.

Career 
Dobervich is a licensed social worker in the state of North Dakota . She was previously employed by HCR ManorCare, FirstLINK and the Alzheimer's Association Minnesota-North Dakota. Dobervich is currently employed as Public Health Policy Manager for the American Indian Public Health Resource Center at North Dakota State University,  and is currently pursuing a Master of Public Health degree.

In 2016 she was appointed to the North Dakota House of Representatives to fill a seat vacated by Representative Kris Wallman. During the 65th Session of the North Dakota Legislature, Dobervich served on the House Industry, Business and Labor, and Transportation Committees.  During the 65th Session Interim she served on the Health Services and Health Care Reform Committees.

She serves as the current President of the North Dakota Rural Health Association, and sits on the CHI Health at Home Board of Directors. Dobervich is a member of the American Public Health Association, North Dakota Public Health Association, North Dakota Rural Health Association, the Daughters of the American Revolution Dakotah Chapter, American Legion Auxiliary Post 151 Harry W Lindberg, North Dakota Farmers Union and an Awesome Foundation Cass Clay trustee. She previously has served as the Chairperson, Co-Chair, and Secretary for the District 11 Dem-NPL.

References

Living people
Minot State University alumni
Women state legislators in North Dakota
1973 births
Politicians from Bismarck, North Dakota
People from Slope County, North Dakota
21st-century American politicians
21st-century American women politicians
Democratic Party members of the North Dakota House of Representatives